The Wyoming Secretary of State election of 2014 took place on November 4, 2014. The incumbent Secretary of State, Max Maxfield, chose not to run for reelection. Real estate investor Ed Murray defeated Jennifer Young and Howard "Kit" Carson of the Constitution and Libertarian parties without any opposition from the Wyoming Democratic Party with 69.98% of the vote. However, despite losing the Republican primary Edward Buchanan would later be appointed Secretary of State after Murray`s resignation.

Republican Primary

Candidates

Declared
 Ed Murray, real estate investor	
 Edward Buchanan, Speaker of the Wyoming House of Representatives	
 Peter S. Illoway, state Representative	
 Clark Stith, member of the Rock Springs City Council from Ward 1

Withdrew
 Dan Zwonitzer, state representative

Declined
 Max Maxfield, incumbent Secretary of State

Fundraising

Results

Third Parties

Candidates

Declared
 Jennifer Young (Constitution), Wyoming Constitution Party Chairwoman
 Howard Carson (Libertarian), future President of the Wyoming Libertarian Party

Fundraising

Results

References

Secretary of State
Wyoming Secretary of State elections
Wyoming
November 2014 events in the United States